Abram Creek may refer to:

 Abram Creek (Ohio)
 Abram Creek (West Virginia)
 Abram Branch, a stream which feeds Jackson Swamp in Robeson County, North Carolina
 Abrahams Creek, a tributary of the Susquehanna River in Luzerne County, Pennsylvania

See also
 Abrams Creek (disambiguation)